Oknoplast is a Polish multinational company established in 1994 in Kraków that manufactures PVC windows, window components, doors, aluminium products and roller shutters. Currently based in Ochmanów with their enterprise zone near Kraków. Facilities of Oknoplast consist  of 32 000 m² manufacturing area, offices, warehousing and storage facilities.

Oknoplast currently has over 1450 showrooms based in Poland, Czech Republic, Slovakia, Hungary, Switzerland, Slovenia, Austria, Germany, Italy and France. The company cooperates with German components supplier VEKA.

History 
 1994 – foundation of the Oknoplast Kraków Production Company, start-up of PVC doors and windows manufacturing
 1997 – start-up of aluminium joinery manufacturing
 2000 – moving company from Kraków to enterprise zone in Ochmanow, Niepołomice borough
 2005 – start-up of export selling
 2009 – start-up of aluminium and PVC roller shutters manufacturing
 2010 – change of name from Oknoplast Kraków Production Company to Oknoplast
 2012 – Oknoplast signing a sponsorship deal with Internazionale Milano
 2012 – start-up of pane manufacturing

Awards  
 Lider rynku 2012 – (ninefold) award for "Best Firms in Poland" in the production of PVC windows
 TOP Builder 2012 – a distinction awarded by the Builder magazine
 Forbes Diamonds 2010 – award for the most dynamic companies
 TERAZ POLSKA 2010 –  promotional emblem awarded for the best products. Award given for the PLATINIUM windows

Source:

See also 
 Economy of Poland
 List of Polish companies

References 

Companies based in Kraków
Polish companies established in 1994
Glassmaking companies of Poland
Window manufacturers
Polish brands
Polish Limited Liability Companies